Miroslav Svoboda may refer to:

Miroslav Svoboda (footballer), Slovak football player and coach
Miroslav Svoboda (ice hockey) (born 1995), Czech ice hockey player
Miroslav Svoboda (actor) (1910–1988), Czech actor featured in Workers, Let's Go, The World Is Ours and Záhada modrého pokoje